Deyan Ranko Brashich (16 September 1940 – 30 August 2019) was a Serbian-American attorney, author, and columnist.

Life 
Brashich, born in Belgrade in 1940, fled communist Yugoslavia in 1946. His father was a Serbian royalist and anti-communist figure. He was a graduate of Connecticut's Trinity College, the New York University School of Law and The Hague Academy of International Law. He attended the University of Grenoble and University of Hartford's School of Art at the Wadsworth Athenaeum.

Admitted to the New York Bar in 1966, he was a seasoned attorney and skilled litigator. Beginning in the mid-1960s, Deyan had a vibrant and varied career in private practice in New York City with the law firm Brashich & Finley. He was attracted to all cases, civil and criminal, which spoke to his conscience, venturesomeness, or heralded the underdog. Deyan was personally invested in the welfare of each of his clients—which included multinational businesses as well as underserved individuals in Nigeria, Liberia, Argentina, Yugoslavia, and the United States—traveling around the world on their behalf, for cases both large and small.

Deyan will be remembered for a number of important cases: recovering purloined art—Constantin Brâncuși’s The Muse; representing the politically jailed Graiver family in Argentina; and for his involvement in cases before the Supreme Court for the United States and circuit Courts of Appeal such as Schwartz v Postel, Regents v Bakke, Steelworkers v Weber, and Brashich v Port Authority of New York and New Jersey on constitutional challenges; and as lead defense counsel at the International Criminal Tribunal for the Former Yugoslavia (ICTY) in the Hague for Momcilo Krajisnik and Stevan Todorovic, both accused of war crimes. In a historic case that attracted much notoriety, Deyan also represented Nikola Kavaja, the "Assassin Who Failed to kill Tito" and hijacker of American Airlines Flight 293. In June 1979, Deyan boarded the hijacked plane at Chicago's O’Hare International Airport and negotiated the release of 135 passengers, substituted himself as hostage, and surrendered his client at Shannon, Ireland.

Deyan was also an adjunct professor of law at Pace University, White Plains, New York, from 1983 to 1989. Steadfastly proud of his Serbian heritage, Deyan was a founding member of the Serbian-American Bar Association and was decorated with the Orders of Star of Karadjordje and St. Sava (Royal, Yugoslav), as well as the Selective Service Medal (Civil, US).

One of Deyan's passions was the written word: he authored commentaries on domestic as well as international legal topics, including in The New York Law Journal; Op-Ed essays on political, legal, and social issues of the day for his blog Contrary Views; and magazine articles covering literature and art (also an artist, Deyan's paintings were shown in galleries in the early sixties). Deyan was Editor and Publisher of The Foothills News (CT); Editor-at-Large for The Country and Abroad''; and Contributing-Editor for the publications Passport (US), Scrisul Romanesc (Romania), Pecat (Serbia), Britic (UK) and Ekurd Daily (Kurdish). He also self-published three books—Letters from America: Essays with a New York State of Mind (2013), Contrary Views: Columns from the Litchfield County Times (2003–2014), and Dispatches (2017). 

His is survived by his wife, Patricia Tunsky-Brashich of New York, NY and their daughter, Arianna Evers (Tunsky-Brashich) of Washington, DC (Austin, Hudson, and Sienna). With his first wife, Catherine Sidor of Greenwich, Connecticut, he had two daughters Alexis Morledge (Brashich) of New York (Louis Sr., Louis Jr., and Alexander) and Audrey Sjöholm (Brashich) of Vancouver, BC (Christopher, Oliver, and Felix). He took great interest in the development of his grandchildren. He is also survived by his older brother, Neboysha R. Brashich of Cutchogue, New York (Prunella, Alexander, and Nicholas).

 Legal career 
Admitted to the New York Bar in 1966, Brashich was a litigator. He recovered purloined art – Constantin Brâncuși's The Muse; he represented the politically jailed Graiver family in Argentina and international business interests from Nigeria, Liberia, Argentina and Yugoslavia. He espoused constitutional/equal protection challenges, appearing before the Supreme Court in Schwartz v Postel, Regents v Bakke, Steelworkers v Weber as well as in Brashich v Port Authority.

He was a professor at Pace University School of Law, White Plains, New York from 1983 to 1989.

He was a founding member of the Serbian-American Bar Association.

He represented Nikola Kavaja, the "Assassin Who Failed to Kill Tito" and the hijacker of American Airlines Flight 293. In June 1979 he boarded the hijacked plane at Chicago's O'Hare International Airport and negotiated the release of 135 passengers; he substituted himself as hostage and surrendered his client at Shannon, Ireland.

He defended Momcilo Krajisnik, the Speaker of the People's Assembly of Republika Srpska and a member of the Presidency of Bosnia and Herzegovina (1996–1998) and Stevan Todorovic, both accused of war crimes before the International Criminal Tribunal for the former Yugoslavia, the Hague, the Netherlands.

He was decorated with the Orders of the Star of Karadjeorge and St. Sava [Royal, Yugoslav]; Selective Service Medal [Civil US].

Publisher, op-ed columnist and author
Brashich was editor and publisher of The Foothill News, 1984–1991.

He was an op-ed columnist for several US newspapers. His column won 2nd place Award 2011 for Best Opinion Column. He is editor-at-large for The Country and Abroad, an art and museum magazine and writes the Letter from America column for Scrisul Romanesc, a literary magazine published in Romania. He was a frequent contributor to Pecat, Britic and EKurd Daily.
 Schwartz v Postel, The Making of Modern Law [with David E Blabey], 2011
 Letters from America: Essays with a New York State of Mind, 2013
 Contrary Views: Columns from The Litchfield County Times,'' 2015

References 

1940 births
2019 deaths
Writers from Belgrade
Yugoslav emigrants to the United States